Hiwatashi (written:  or ) is a Japanese surname. Notable people with the surname include:

, Japanese entrepreneur and businessman
Tomoki Hiwatashi (born 2000), American figure skater
, Japanese idol, singer and voice actress

Fictional characters
, a character in the anime series BNA: Brand New Animal

See also
10601 Hiwatashi, a main-belt asteroid

Japanese-language surnames